The Delaware Biotechnology Institute (DBI) at the University of Delaware is a partnership among government, academia and industry to help establish the First State as a center of excellence in biotechnology and the life sciences. The Institute's mission is to facilitate a biotechnology network of people and core instrumentation to enhance existing academic and private-sector research, catalyze unique cross-disciplinary research and education initiatives, and to foster the entrepreneurship that creates high-quality jobs.

Adjacent to the University of Delaware main campus, DBI's  research facility is located in the  Delaware Technology Park, home to a range of established and new technology businesses.  The DBI laboratory houses more than 180 faculty and students, allowing for valuable collaborations and the opportunity to share the institute's professionally managed core instrumentation centers.

Research at the Delaware Biotechnology Institute has application in agriculture, environmental science, and human health, featuring leading-edge work in bioinformatics, genomics and small RNA biology, materials science, molecular medicine and proteomics.

Partner Institutions 
 University of Delaware
 Delaware State University
 Delaware Technical & Community College
 Wesley College
 Christiana Care Health System
 Nemours/Alfred I. duPont Hospital for Children
Delaware Bio
Delaware Prosperity Partnership
Fraunhofer

Core Facilities 
As a key component of being a center of excellence in life science research, DBI provides shared research instrumentation.  A broad range of core instrumentation is located within DBI, along with personnel experienced in equipment usage.  Other core instrumentation located across the UD campus may also be accessed by faculty.

References

External links
 Delaware Biotechnology Institute official site

University of Delaware
Biotechnology organizations
2001 establishments in Delaware
Organizations established in 2001
2001 establishments in the United States